The Euskal Hiztegi Historiko-Etimologikoa (EHHE; English: Basque Historical-Etymological Dictionary) is a historical and etymological dictionary of Basque, published by the Royal Academy of the Basque language, edited by Joseba Lakarra, Julen Manterola, and Iñaki Segurola. It is the first comprehensive historical and etymological Basque dictionary.

See also
History of the Basque language
Koldo Mitxelena

References

External links
Euskal Hiztegi Historiko-Etimologikoa (EHHE-200) (full online version)
Hiztegia (Dictionary)
Eranskinak (Appendices)
Aurkibideak (Contents)

Basque dictionaries
Etymological dictionaries